Williamstown is an unincorporated community in northern Lewis County, Missouri, United States. It is located at the intersection of Missouri Supplemental Routes A and E, approximately twenty miles northwest of Canton. The community is part of the Quincy, IL–MO Micropolitan Statistical Area.

Demographics

History
Williamstown was laid out in 1856. The community was named for its founder, Minus Williams.

References

Unincorporated communities in Lewis County, Missouri
Quincy, Illinois micropolitan area
Unincorporated communities in Missouri